Patrick Clancy (17 March 1877 – 21 February 1947) was an Irish Labour Party politician.

Born in Bruff, County Limerick in 1877, to John Clancy and Bridget Clancy (née Farrell). He was educated at St Patrick's seminary, Bruff, and became carpenter like his father.

A committed trade unionist, he was prominent in the Irish Land and Labour Association, and was a member of the Irish Volunteers, and the East Limerick brigade of the IRA.

He was elected to Dáil Éireann as a Labour Party Teachta Dála (TD) for the Limerick constituency at the 1923 general election. He was re-elected at the June 1927 and September 1927 general elections. He lost his seat at the 1932 general election, running as Independent Labour.

He married Bridget Higgins in 1911, and they had four children. 

One of his brothers was George Clancy, who was assassinated in 1921 by the Black and Tans while serving as Mayor of Limerick.

References

1877 births
1947 deaths
Labour Party (Ireland) TDs
Members of the 4th Dáil
Members of the 5th Dáil
Members of the 6th Dáil
Politicians from County Limerick